Madhab Rajbangshi (7 July 1954) is an Indian Politician.He was elected to the Lok Sabha the lower house of the Indian Parliament from the Mangaldoi constituency of Assam in 1998 and 1999 and was a member of the Indian National Congress.He joined the Asom Gana Parishad on 18th March 2014.

References

External links
  Official biographical sketch in the Lok Sabha website

1954 births
Indian National Congress politicians
Living people
India MPs 1998–1999
India MPs 1999–2004
Lok Sabha members from Assam
Indian National Congress politicians from Assam